Johnny Lu (born May 8, 1977) is an American-Taiwanese actor.

Life and career 
Lu was born in Taipei City, Taiwan. His father, was one of the founding members of the Bamboo Union triad in Taiwan. Lu's parents divorced, and then at the age of eight Lu moved to America, where he spent the rest of his childhood. He later attended University of California in Irvine, California, earning a bachelor's degree in English studies.

After various modeling work, Lu crossed over to acting in 2002, and subsequently had small roles in films such as Lost in Time,  Fantasia and Driving Miss Wealthy. In 2008, he returned to Taiwan and appeared in his first Mandarin-language series, Police et vous, playing the role of a businessman. Lu then starred in numerous television series such as Who's The One, Next Heroes, In Between, True Love 365, Life Plan A and B, as well as the film 100 Days, which was released in 2013.

Personal life 
Lu married his high school girlfriend, Tammi, in Los Angeles in 2008. They have a son and a daughter.

Filmography

Television series

Film

Variety show

Music video

Discography

Awards and nominations

References

External links 

1977 births
Living people
21st-century Taiwanese male actors
Taiwanese male film actors
Taiwanese male television actors
21st-century American male actors
American male film actors
American male television actors
Male actors from Taipei
University of California, Irvine alumni